Carl Gantvoort (1883 – September 28, 1935) was a stage and screen actor in the United States. He starred in The Gray Dawn (1922).

He attended the University of Cincinnati.

His theatrical performances included a role as Little John in a 1912 production of Robin Hood. He also had roles in Little Simplicity, The Maid of the Mountains, The Riviera Girl, Pom-pom as Bertrand, Iole as George Wayne, and The Geisha.

Personal life 
His father, Arnold J. Gantvoort, was manager of CCM and taught classes. His mother was Nettie Looker, granddaughter of Othniel Looker. He had 6 siblings: Hermann, Gertrude, Bertha, Brunhilde, Elsa, and Helen.

He was married to Anne Brussert, who he met when she was performing a play in Ohio. They married after he completed college and divorced in 1922.

Filmography
Man of the Forest (1921), a Western 
Mysterious Rider (1921)
 A Certain Rich Man (1921)
The Lure of Egypt (1921)
When Romance Rides (1922)
The Gray Dawn (1922)
Heart's Haven (1922)
Golden Dreams (1922)

Gallery

References

External links

 
 
 

1883 births
1935 deaths